"Flat Foot Floogie (with a Floy Floy)" (also "The Flat Foot Floogee") is a 1938 jazz song, written by Slim Gaillard, Slam Stewart, and Bud Green, and performed by Gaillard and Stewart as Slim & Slam.

"Flat Foot Floogie" was Slim & Slam's first and biggest hit song. Their version was one of the top records of 1938, peaking at number two on US charts.

History
Bulee "Slim" Gaillard (1911–1991) and Leroy "Slam" Stewart (1914–1987) met in New York City in 1936 and formed a duo, performing together on the radio and in 52nd Street clubs, with Gaillard on guitar and vocals and Stewart on bass. They attracted radio pioneer Martin Block to manage them and he arranged a contract with Vocalion. On February 17, 1938, Slim and Slam recorded "Flat Foot Floogie" (Vocalion 4021).

Gaillard sold the publishing rights to "Flat Foot Floogie" to Green Brothers and Knight for $250, and writing credit was shared with Bud Green. Shortly thereafter, Benny Goodman & His Orchestra played it on the Camel Caravan radio show, launching its rise to popularity.

Slim & Slam's record peaked at number 2 on Billboard charts and at number 5 on Your Hit Parade.

Lyrics
The lyrics are brief and are dominated by the repetition of the title words and the nonsense refrain, "floy-doy, floy-doy, floy-doy". The original lyric, recorded in January 1938, was "flat foot floozie with a floy floy". However, Vocalion objected to the word "floozie", meaning a sexually promiscuous woman, or a prostitute. The second recording in February changed the word to "floogie". The second part of the title phrase, "floy floy", was slang for a venereal disease, but the term was not widely known and failed to attract the attention of censors. It was regarded as nonsense and came to have positive connotations as a consequence of the song.

Other versions
Many artists covered the song in 1938: Wingy Manone on May 23; Nat Gonella; Benny Goodman & His Orchestra on May 31 (Victor 25871); Louis Armstrong with The Mills Brothers on June 10 (Decca 1876); as well as Woody Herman and Count Basie. In Europe, Fats Waller recorded it in London while on tour (HMV BD5399), an instrumental version was recorded by jazz guitarist Django Reinhardt (Decca F-6776) and the Dutch singing duo Johnny and Jones covered it.

Gaillard recorded "Flat Foot Floogie" again in 1945 for Bel-Tone, with an ensemble that included Charlie Parker, Dizzy Gillespie, and Jack McVea, one of several songs recorded during the session. Bel-Tone went bankrupt, but the recordings were acquired by Majestic and released in 1946.

The song has continued to be revisited over the years. The Jacksons performed it twice on their 1970s variety show, the Ukulele Orchestra of Great Britain has included it in performances, and Nina Hagen covered it on her 2006 album Irgendwo auf der Welt.

In other media
In “Three Sappy People” Curly tells Moe and Larry that he is “flat as a floogie” meaning he was broke. 
The title for the 1938 Three Stooges film, Flat Foot Stooges, is a play on the song's title. The Goodman version of the song is heard in the 1993 film Swing Kids.

It was one of three pieces of music included in the 1938 Westinghouse Time Capsule, along with Finlandia by Jean Sibelius and "The Stars and Stripes Forever" by John Philip Sousa.

On the October 16, 1938, Jack Benny radio program, Mary Livingston reads a poem that concludes with a reference to “Flatfoot Mary with a Floy Floy.”

The song is briefly referenced in the Walt Disney animated film Pinocchio in the scene where Honest John tries to convince Pinocchio to come to Pleasure Island.

Bill Holman's comic strip Smokey Stover contained a reference to the song in its November 26, 1938, edition: "It sounds like flat foot Flanagan with the foo foo." Here, "flat foot" is slang for a police officer; Flanagan is reporting that an arsonist has escaped by burning down the jail.

In the 1939 film Twelve Crowded Hours gangster George Costain (played by Cy Kendall) takes his "guests" to the Floy Floy Club.

The 1980 film Atlantic City featured an aging gangster, played by Burt Lancaster, reminiscing about the heyday of the resort town when "Flatfoot Floogie with the Floy Floy" was a   hit song.

In an episode of the radio series Journey Into Space, set in 1971, the song is briefly played as "the latest hit" and clues the crew into the fact that something strange is going on, either with the timeline or with some of the characters they meet.

In Season One Episode One of Better Things, the song is played as the closing track just as the Sam Fox the main character has indicated she would rather not do a particular sex scene in the show she is on given it triggers an uncomfortable memory for her.

Notes

References

External links
 "Flat Foot Floogie" on The Wonderful World of Louis Armstrong, blog by Armstrong historian Ricky Riccardi
 "Flat Foot Floogee", 1938 rendition by Wingy Manone Orchestra, at the Internet Archive
 "Flat Foot Floogie" 1938 rendition by Louis Armstrong with the Mills Brothers on vocals, at the Internet Archive

1938 songs
1945 songs
Jazz songs
1930s jazz standards
Hokum blues songs
Songs written by Slim Gaillard
Vocalion Records singles
Songs with lyrics by Bud Green